Julia Jacklin is an Australian singer-songwriter from the Blue Mountains region of New South Wales. Jacklin's musical style has been described as indie pop, indie folk, and alternative country. She has released three studio albums, Don't Let the Kids Win (2016), Crushing (2019) and Pre Pleasure (2022). Jacklin has also performed with the band Phantastic Ferniture, with whom she released the debut single "Fuckin 'n' Rollin" and a self-titled album in 2018, followed by subsequent singles.

Early life and education 
Jacklin grew up in the Blue Mountains, Australia, in a family of school teachers. Inspired by Britney Spears, at the age of 10, she took classical singing lessons before joining a high school band which did Avril Lavigne and Evanescence covers. She studied social policy at Sydney University, and after graduating she lived in a garage in Glebe, a suburb of Sydney, and worked in a factory making essential oils. Growing up, Jacklin did not know anyone who was a full-time musician, and her family did not understand what it meant to be a musician: “They didn’t really see it as being something that was going to work out, at all,” Jacklin says in an interview with Sound of Boston.

Early career 
Jacklin continued to perform locally, and formed the band Salta together with Liz Hughes in 2012.

Solo career

2016: Don't Let the Kids Win

Jacklin gained an audience and significant critical acclaim through her first two singles, "Pool Party" and "Coming of Age", which both received radio airplay on BBC Radio 6 Music. She toured extensively from March 2016 in the US, UK, Europe and Australia, appearing at various festivals (most notably End of the Road Festival, Electric Picnic and South by Southwest). She has played headline gigs and has also supported artists such as First Aid Kit, Whitney, Marlon Williams and Okkervil River. In 2016, Rolling Stone Australia tipped Jacklin as one of their "Future Is Now" artists, while Triple J nominated her for a J Award for Unearthed Artist of the Year. Jacklin did not consider herself a full-time musician until August 2016, when she really started touring and figured she could not manage her regular job anymore.

Her debut studio album, Don't Let The Kids Win, was released in October 2016 on Transgressive Records. The Guardian described it as "one of those albums that will slowly creep into the affections of a large number of people" while Rolling Stone Australia found her songs "simple and unadorned". Jacklin was working at an essential oils factory to save money to record with producer Ben Edwards, having been inspired by Aldous Harding's debut album. The album was recorded and produced by Edwards in Lyttelton, New Zealand over a three-week period. It features Eddie Boyd (guitar), Tom Stephens (drums, bass), Mitchell Lloyd (bass), Joe McCallum (drums).

In early 2016, she released her single "Pool Party" independently, and became one of the stand out acts at SXSW the same year, receiving rave reviews from publications such as The New York Times, Vogue, Brooklyn Vegan and NME. Off the back of SXSW she signed with Transgressive Records, Polyvinyl Record Co. and Liberation Music and showcased at The Great Escape Festival in the UK. Following the release of the album, she went on to perform at major festivals including Glastonbury Festival, Latitude Festival, Newport Folk Festival, Splendour in the Grass and Falls Festival.

In January 2017, Julia Jacklin was named "Next Big Thing" at the FBi SMAC Awards for 2016 before she embarked on another extensive tour of Europe. She achieved various award nominations including ARIA Charts Female Artist of the Year, J Award for Album of the Year, as well as APRA Music Awards of 2017 Song of the Year for her single 'Pool Party'.

2017: "Eastwick" / "Cold Caller"

In September 2017, Julia Jacklin released a 7" single featuring two songs, once again recorded with producer Ben Edwards in Lyttelton, New Zealand. Touring in support of the single, Jacklin headlined Shepherd's Bush Empire in London on top of selling out shows in Los Angeles, New York City, Toronto, Melbourne, Sydney and cities throughout the United Kingdom.

2018–2020: Crushing 

In March 2018, Jacklin confirmed, via social media, that she had completed her second album. The album was recorded with producer Burke Reid (Courtney Barnett, The Drones) and features Blain Cunneen (guitar), Dominic Rizzo (piano), Clayton Allen (drums), Harry Fuller (bass) and Georgia Mulligan (backing vocals). Singles released prior to the album's release included "Body", "Head Alone", "Pressure To Party" and "Comfort". Crushing was released in February 2019, and was warmly received by critics with an average score of 85 on Metacritic, based on 26 reviews from mainstream publications. In light of the release of Crushing, Jacklin came at number 4 in Happy Mags list of "The 15 Australian female artists changing the game right now".

Jacklin has stated that the song, "Head Alone" was written about personal boundaries, contrasting with the encroachment of her personal and physical space during album tours and relationships.

The tour in support of Crushing included festival dates at Shaky Knees Music Festival, Latitude Festival and Forecastle Festival, as well as sold out headline shows for the majority of her world tour.

In October 2020 Julia Jacklin released a 7" single for the fifth volume of the Sub Pop Singles Club containing two new songs, "To Perth, Before the Border Closes" and "Cry".

2022–present: Pre Pleasure
On 10 May 2022, Jacklin announced her album Pre Pleasure with a 26 August release date via Polyvinyl. She accompanied the announcement with the release of her single "Lydia Wears a Cross". The album was released in August 2022.

Phantastic Ferniture 
In 2014, Jacklin formed the indie garage group Phantastic Ferniture along with members Elizabeth Hughes (guitar) and Ryan K Brennan (drums).

In May 2018, the band released their debut single "Fuckin 'n' Rollin", accompanied by a music video directed by Nick McKinlay. In July 2018 the band released its self-titled album, produced by drummer Ryan K Brennan. The album featured subsequent singles "Gap Year", "Bad Timing" and "Dark Corner Dance Floor".

Musical and visual style
Allmusic described her music as a "meld of dreamy indie pop and confessional alt-country", while she cites as her influences Doris Day, The Andrews Sisters, Björk and Billy Bragg. She has also mentioned Fiona Apple and Leonard Cohen as influences.

In an interview with Sound of Boston, Jacklin notes her music video style is inspired by Lars Tunbjörk, a Swedish photographer who captured the mundane and absurd moments of modern life. Jacklin has co-directing credits on all of her music videos to date. In February 2019, Stella Donnelly released a music video for her single "Tricks", in which Jacklin co-directed with longtime collaborator Nick McKinlay.

Discography

Studio albums

Singles

Awards and nominations

AIR Awards
The Australian Independent Record Awards (commonly known informally as AIR Awards) is an annual awards night to recognise, promote and celebrate the success of Australia's Independent Music sector.

|-
| rowspan="2" | AIR Awards of 2017
| herself 
| Breakthrough Independent Artist
| 
|-
| Don't Let the Kids Win
| Best Independent Blues and Roots Album 
| 
|-
| AIR Awards of 2019
| herself 
| Best Independent Artist
| 
|-
| rowspan="3" | AIR Awards of 2020
| rowspan="2" | Crushing
| Best Independent Album
| 
|-
| Best Independent Blues and Roots Album 
| 
|-
| "Don't Know How to Keep Loving You"
| Independent Song of the Year
| 
|-

APRA Awards
The APRA Awards are presented annually from 1982 by the Australasian Performing Right Association (APRA), "honouring composers and songwriters".

! 
|-
| 2017
| "Pool Party" by Julia Jacklin
| Song of the Year
| 
|
|-
| 2020
| "Pressure to Party" by Julia Jacklin
| Song of the Year
| 
|
|-
| 2023
| "Lydia Wears a Cross"
| Song of the Year 
|  
| 
|-

ARIA Music Awards
The ARIA Music Awards is an annual awards ceremony that recognises excellence, innovation, and achievement across all genres of Australian music. Jacklin have been nominated for eight awards.

! 
|-
| rowspan="2"| 2017
| Don't Let the Kids Win
| Best Female Artist
| 
| rowspan="2"|
|-
| Nick McKinlay for Don't Let the Kids Win
| Best Cover Art
| 
|-
| rowspan="6"| 2019
| rowspan="3"| Crushing
| Best Female Artist
| 
| rowspan="6"|
|-
| Best Independent Release
| 
|-
| Best Adult Contemporary Album
| 
|-
| Nick McKK for Crushing
| Best Cover Art
| 
|-
| rowspan="2"| Burke Reid for Crushing
| Engineer of the Year
| 
|-
| Producer of the Year
| 
|-
| rowspan="4"| 2022
| rowspan="3"| Pre Pleasure
| Best Solo Artist
| 
| rowspan="4"|
|-
| Best Independent Release
| 
|-
| Best Adult Contemporary Album
| 
|-
| "Lydia Wears a Cross" by Julia Jacklin
| Best Video 
| 
|-

Australian Music Prize
The Australian Music Prize (the AMP) is an annual award of $30,000 given to an Australian band or solo artist in recognition of the merit of an album released during the year of award. It exists to discover, reward and promote new Australian music of excellence.

!  
|-
| 2019
| Crushing
| Australian Music Prize
| 
| 
|-
| 2022
| Pre Pleasure
| Australian Music Prize
| 
| 
|-

J Awards
The J Awards are an annual series of Australian music awards that were established by the Australian Broadcasting Corporation's youth-focused radio station Triple J.

! 
|-
| rowspan="2"| 2016
| themselves
| Unearthed Artist of the Year
| 
| rowspan="2"|
|-
| Don't Let the Kids Win
| Australian Album of the Year
| 
|-
| 2019
| themselves
| Double J Artist of the Year
| 
|
|-
| 2022
| Pre Pleasure
|Australian Album of the Year
| 
|
|-

Music Victoria Awards
The Music Victoria Awards are an annual awards night celebrating Victorian music. They commenced in 2006.

! 
|-
|rowspan="2"| 2022
| "Lydia Wears a Cross"
| Best Victorian Song
| 
|rowspan="2"|
|-
| Julia Jacklin
| Best Solo Artist
|

National Live Music Awards
The National Live Music Awards (NLMAs) are a broad recognition of Australia's diverse live industry, celebrating the success of the Australian live scene. The awards commenced in 2016.

|-
| National Live Music Awards of 2016
| herself
| The Heatseeker Award (Best New Act)
| 
|-
| rowspan="5" | National Live Music Awards of 2017
| rowspan="5" | herself
| Live Voice of the Year
| 
|-
| Live Country or Folk Act of the Year
| 
|-
| International Live Achievement (Solo)
| 
|-
| Best Live Voice of the Year (People's Choice)
| 
|-
| NSW Live Voice of the Year
| 
|-
| National Live Music Awards of 2018
| herself
| NSW Live Voice of the Year
| 
|-
| rowspan="2" | National Live Music Awards of 2019
| rowspan="2" | herself
| Live Voice of the Year
| 
|-
| International Live Achievement (Solo)
| 
|-

Rolling Stone Australia Awards
The Rolling Stone Australia Awards are awarded annually in January or February by the Australian edition of Rolling Stone magazine for outstanding contributions to popular culture in the previous year.

! 
|-
| 2023
| Pre Pleasure 
| Best Record
| 
| 
|-

References

External links
 

1990 births
Living people
ARIA Award winners
Australian indie pop musicians
Australian women singer-songwriters
21st-century Australian singers
21st-century Australian women singers
People from the Blue Mountains (New South Wales)